Chris Swain is an American game designer, entrepreneur, and professor. He is the founder of two venture-backed game companies. He worked full-time as a professor at The University of Southern California from 2004-2011.

Swain started his career in at Robert Abel’s interactive software company Synapse Technologies. Chris was VP of Programming at game developer Spiderdance, Inc, where his work included participatory television projects. He was a founding member of R/GA Interactive. Swain co-founded the Electronic Arts Game Innovation Lab at USC and served as the director of the USC Games Institute. He co-authored the first edition of Game Design Workshop: Designing, Prototyping, & Playtesting Games with Tracy Fullerton and Steven Hoffman in 2004.

Notable projects in his early career include: Netwits for the Microsoft Network, Multiplayer Jeopardy! and Multiplayer Wheel of Fortune for Sony Online, Stickerworld for Children's Television Workshop, and Poetry of Structure, the interactive companion to Ken Burns’ documentary about Frank Lloyd Wright.

Swain served on the board of directors of the Academy of Television Arts & Sciences from 2000 to 2004.

The games SurgeWorld and Immune Attack (2006) address health topics. The Redistricting Game (2006) models gerrymandering, aimed at informing voters. Enhanced Learning with Creative Technologies (ELECT) is a project funded by the US Military which produced a game on urbanism, as well as a game about bi-lateral negotiation.

Swain is also known for his mentorship of students at USC. Several projects by his students, for which he was their advisor, have gone on to become published games. These include fl0w (Sony PlayStation), Misadventures of P.B. Winterbottom (2K Games), and Reflection (Konami).

In 2010, Swain founded the games studio Talkie for story-driven social games. They created the Facebook game Ecotopia to promote environmental conservation, launched in 2011.

References

External links
 Video of Chris Swain speaking at MIT on the Future of Games
 Interview in Forbes about independent games

American academics
American video game designers
Year of birth missing (living people)
Living people
American male writers
University of Southern California faculty